is a Japanese manufacturer of air compressors, coating equipment and systems, and vacuum pump and liquid application equipment.

The company also produces painting robots developed with Mitsubishi Heavy Industry.

References

External links

Official site 
 Global Network 
  Wiki collection of bibliographic works on ANEST IWATA

Manufacturing companies based in Yokohama
Companies listed on the Tokyo Stock Exchange
Manufacturing companies established in 1926
1926 establishments in Japan
Japanese brands